Mike Martineau (c. 1959 – September 8, 2012) was an American television writer and stand-up comedian. His writing credits included episodes of The Larry Sanders Show, Mad About You, and The Job. Most recently, Martineau wrote for Rescue Me, which aired on the FX Network between 2004 and 2011.

Martineau was raised on the Massachusetts' South Shore and attended the University of Massachusetts Amherst. He worked as a comedian before moving from Boston to Los Angeles to pursue writing. Martineau died from heart disease in North Hollywood, California, on August 8, 2012, at the age of 53. He is survived by his wife, Karen, and two daughters, Talia and Ava.

References

2012 deaths
American television writers
American male television writers
University of Massachusetts Amherst alumni
Year of birth uncertain